Patrik Langvardt (born 6 December 1971) is a former professional tennis player from Denmark.

Career
Langvardt represented Denmark in the Davis Cup competition from 2000 until 2002.  He made his debut in 2000 during the Europe/Africa Zone Group II, second round against the Ivory Coast. Langvardt played in four Davis Cup ties, winning 2 of the 4 singles matches and the one doubles match, that he played.

After retiring from professional tennis, Langvardt began coaching tennis. He started a tennis academy at the Trelleborg Tennis Club in Sweden and since 2012 he has been the coach of the Danish player, Frederik Nielsen.

See also
List of Denmark Davis Cup team representatives

References

External links

1971 births
Living people
Danish male tennis players